The 2017–18 George Washington Colonials women's basketball team will represent George Washington University during the 2017–18 NCAA Division I women's basketball season. The Colonials, led by second year head coach Jennifer Rizzotti, play their home games at Charles E. Smith Center and were members of the Atlantic 10 Conference. They finished the season 19–14, 10–6 in A-10 play to finish in a tie for fifth place. They won the A-10 tournament by defeating Saint Joseph's and received an automatic bid to the NCAA women's tournament where they lost to Ohio State in the first round.

Media

WRGW will carry the Colonials games and broadcast them online at GWRadio.com. The A-10 Digital Network will carry all non-televised Colonials home games and most conference road games through RaiseHigh Live.

Roster

Schedule

|-
!colspan=9 style="background:#; color:white;"| Non-conference regular season

|-
!colspan=9 style="background:#; color:white;"| Atlantic 10 regular season

|-
!colspan=9 style="background:#; color:white;"| Atlantic 10 Women's Tournament

|-
!colspan=9 style="background:#; color:white;"| NCAA Women's Tournament

Rankings
2017–18 NCAA Division I women's basketball rankings

See also
 2017–18 George Washington Colonials men's basketball team

References

George Washington
George Washington Colonials women's basketball seasons
George Washington